The 1953 North Carolina Tar Heels football team represented the University of North Carolina at Chapel Hill during the 1953 college football season. The Tar Heels were led by first-year head coach George T. Barclay, and played their home games at Kenan Memorial Stadium. The team competed as a member of the Atlantic Coast Conference, in the conference's inaugural year, finishing tied for third.

Schedule

References

North Carolina
North Carolina Tar Heels football seasons
North Carolina Tar Heels football